Darkened Rooms is a 1929 American pre-Code mystery film directed by Louis J. Gasnier and starring Evelyn Brent. It was an early talking picture. This film is preserved at the Library of Congress. The film tried to cash in on the interest in spiritualism caused by the then-popular Harry Houdini, but critics felt the film couldn't quite decide whether it was debunking the supernatural, or embracing it.

Plot
A down-on-his-luck photographer named Emory Jago teams up with a phony fortune teller named Ellen in a scheme to cheat naive people out of their cash with phony predictions. But as time goes on, Jago begins to believe that Ellen really does possess supernatural powers.

Cast
 Evelyn Brent as Ellen, the fortune teller
 Neil Hamilton as Emory Jago
 Doris Hill as Joyce Clayton
 David Newell as Billy
 Gale Henry as Madame Silvara
 Wallace MacDonald as Bert Nelson
 Blanche Craig as Mrs. Fogarty
 E. H. Calvert as Mr. Clayton

Criticism
Critic Troy Howarth writes "Like many early talkies, Darkened Rooms suffers from primitive staging and technique, though studio technicians managed some spooky sound effects for the seance sequences....Reviews of the day praised leading lady Evelyn Brent."

References

External links

1929 films
1929 mystery films
American mystery films
American black-and-white films
Films directed by Louis J. Gasnier
1920s English-language films
1920s American films